Rio Arriba County is a county in the U.S. state of New Mexico. As of the 2010 census, the population was 40,246. Its county seat is Tierra Amarilla. Its northern border is the Colorado state line.

Rio Arriba County comprises the Española, NM Micropolitan Statistical Area, which is also included in the Albuquerque-Santa Fe-Las Vegas, NM Combined Statistical Area.

History
The county was one of nine originally created for the Territory of New Mexico in 1852.  Originally extending west to the California line, it included the site of present-day Las Vegas, Nevada. The county seat was initially sited at San Pedro de Chamita, and shortly afterwards at Los Luceros. In 1860 the seat was moved to Plaza del Alcalde. Since 1880 Tierra Amarilla has been the county seat.

The Battle of Embudo Pass took place in the southern part of the county during the Mexican–American War in January 1847.

Geography
It is the fifth-largest county in New Mexico by area.

The county acquired its present proportions after the creation of San Juan County and other adjustments.

Adjacent counties

 Taos County - east
 Mora County - southeast
 Santa Fe County - south
 Los Alamos County - south
 Sandoval County - south
 San Juan County - west
 Archuleta County, Colorado - north
 Conejos County, Colorado - north

National protected areas
 Carson National Forest (part)
 El Camino Real de Tierra Adentro National Historic Trail (part)
 Santa Fe National Forest (part)
 Valles Caldera National Preserve (part)

Demographics

2000 census
As of the 2000 census, there were 41,190 people, 15,044 households, and 10,816 families living in the county.  The population density was 7 people per square mile (3/km2).  There were 18,016 housing units at an average density of 3 per square mile (1/km2).  The racial makeup of the county was 56.62% White, 0.35% Black or African American, 13.88% Native American, 0.14% Asian, 0.11% Pacific Islander, 25.62% from other races, and 3.28% from two or more races.  72.89% of the population were Hispanic or Latino of any race.

There were 15,044 households, out of which 36.90% had children under the age of 18 living with them, 48.80% were married couples living together, 15.90% had a female householder with no husband present, and 28.10% were non-families. 23.50% of all households were made up of individuals, and 7.80% had someone living alone who was 65 years of age or older.  The average household size was 2.71 and the average family size was 3.19.

In the county, the population was spread out, with 28.60% under the age of 18, 8.90% from 18 to 24, 28.80% from 25 to 44, 22.90% from 45 to 64, and 10.90% who were 65 years of age or older.  The median age was 34 years. For every 100 females there were 98.00 males.  For every 100 females age 18 and over, there were 97.70 males.

The median income for a household in the county was $29,429, and the median income for a family was $32,901. Males had a median income of $26,897 versus $22,223 for females. The per capita income for the county was $14,263.  About 16.60% of families and 20.30% of the population were below the poverty line, including 23.30% of those under age 18 and 22.90% of those age 65 or over.

2010 census
As of the 2010 census, there were 40,246 people, 15,768 households, and 10,477 families living in the county. The racial makeup of the county was 51.6% white, 16.0% American Indian, 0.5% black or African American, 0.4% Asian, 28.0% from other races, and 3.3% from two or more races. Those of Hispanic or Latino origin made up 71.3% of the population.

The largest ancestry groups were:
 20.6% Mexican
 15.5% Spanish
 4.5% German
 3.2% English
 2.7% Irish
 1.7% French
 1.5% Navajo
 1.2% Scottish

Of the 15,768 households, 33.6% had children under the age of 18 living with them, 42.3% were married couples living together, 16.0% had a female householder with no husband present, 33.6% were non-families, and 28.2% of all households were made up of individuals. The average household size was 2.53 and the average family size was 3.09. The median age was 39.0 years.

The median income for a household in the county was $41,437 and the median income for a family was $47,840. Males had a median income of $39,757 versus $31,657 for females. The per capita income for the county was $19,913. About 15.7% of families and 19.7% of the population were below the poverty line, including 20.6% of those under age 18 and 18.3% of those age 65 or over.

Politics
From New Mexico's statehood to the early 1940s Rio Arriba was a traditional Republican county. The county became a Democratic stronghold from the 1960s onwards. The last Republican presidential candidate to carry the county was Dwight D. Eisenhower in 1956. No Republican candidate for governor has won the county since at least 1966.

It is located in New Mexico's 3rd congressional district, which has a Cook Partisan Voting Index rating of D+7 and is represented by Democrat Teresa Leger Fernandez. In the New Mexico legislature it is represented by Representatives Christine Chandler (District 43),  Susan Herrera (District 41), Derrick Lente (District 65), and Joseph Sanchez (District 40), and by Senators Richard C. Martinez (District 5), Carlos Cisneros (District 6), and Benny Shendo, Jr. (District 22).

Current commissioners are:

Scandals

Sheriff Thomas "Tommy" R. Rodella
Tommy Rodella was first appointed to fill a vacant position on Rio Arriba County Magistrate Court by Governor Bill Richardson. Richardson asked for Rodella's resignation just 4 months later after Rodella went to the county jail in Tierra Amarilla to seek the release of an acquaintance suspected of drunken driving. Rodella refused to step down and was reelected to his judicial post in 2006. He was then removed from the bench in May 2008 by the New Mexico Supreme Court for misconduct.

In 2010 Rodella was elected Sheriff of Rio Arriba County. He defeated many primary candidates, including then Rio Arriba Deputy James Lujan, for the Democratic Party nomination and then ran unopposed in the general election. As Sheriff, Rodella fired Deputy Lujan over allegations the deputy had interfered in a DWI case. Lujan then won a lawsuit against the county to be reinstated as a deputy in 2014.

On August 15, 2014, Rio Arriba County Sheriff Thomas R. Rodella and his son, Thomas R. Rodella, Jr., were arrested by the FBI on a federal indictment charging them with civil rights, firearms, and falsification of documents charges. The charges were related to a road rage incident where the Sheriff Rodella and his son had assaulted a local resident. Sheriff Rodella was convicted in September 2014 of unreasonable use of force, unlawful arrest and using a firearm during a crime of violence. He is currently serving a 10-year sentence in a federal prison in Seagoville, Texas. Sheriff Rodella was then defeated in his 2014 primary race to retain his office by Rio Arriba Sheriffs Deputy James Lujan.

Sheriff James Lujan
After defeating Sherriff Rodella in the Democratic primary James Lujan was to run unopposed in the general election. Instead of waiting until the January inauguration, Rio Arriba County Commission chose Lujan to finish out Rodella's term. He was sworn into office in early October 2014.

On Thursday, May 21, 2020, Rio Arriba Sheriff, James Lujan, was arrested and charged with two counts of obstructing an officer. James Lujan was served a search warrant prior to the arrest, and after he refused to provide the password to his cell phone, which the warrant was for, he was arrested and charged (As of this date U.S. Courts have not definitively ruled on the legality of search warrants requiring the owner of a phone to give up their password). Lujan had been served a search warrant in regard to an investigation where he had interfered with an arrest warrant being served on ex-Española City Councilman Phillip Chacon by the Española Police Department, as well as interfering with a search warrant being served on Española City Councilman John Ramon Vigil for his phone by the Española Police Department. Lujan's arrest pitted Española Police Department backed up by the Taos Sheriff Department's SWAT team against the Rio Arriba Sheriffs Department whose main office is located in Española. Española Police officers and Taos Sheriff's deputies formed a perimeter around the Rio Arriba Sheriiff's office. Rio Arriba Undersheriff Martin Trujillo called Rio Arriba deputies to respond emergent and form a perimeter around the Española Police officers and Taos Sheriff's deputies. This resulted in the departments drawing or nearly drawing guns on each other. Undersheriff Trujillo was  arrested on August 14, 2020, by the Española Police Department after he was charged with criminal solicitation to commit assisting in assault upon a peace officer for his actions in the confrontation between the departments on May 21, 2020.

Eventually the body cams and dash cam footage from several police cruisers of the siege surrounding the Sheriffs Office itself and additional footage was released.

Former Española City Councilman Phillip Chacon
Phillip Chacon is a former Councilman for the City of Española (a city within Rio Arriba County). He tied his opponent in his 2014 reelection bid and lost the election following a coin toss to determine the winner.

He has cases pending against him where he was accused of the stabbing of one of his tenants. Española Police's investigation into this led to the seizure of his cell phone by Española Police Officers. This led to the Española Police finding texts to Councilman Vigil attempting to entice him into having the Zoning Director of the City of Española removed from his position over a property that was to be demolished but that Chacon wanted to buy. This led to Española Police investigating Vigil.

Española City Councilman John Ramon Vigil
In May 2020, John Ramon Vigil, a City Councilman for Española, a city within Rio Arriba County, was charged with three counts of felony bribery and a misdemeanor count of refusing to aid an officer in connection with Chacon trying to garner favors from Vigil over a condemned house. When Española Police attempted to enforce a search warrant they had obtained on Vigil's phone Vigil called Sheriff Lujan for help. Vigil's defense team contends that Española Police went searching for someone to give them a warrant after the First Judicial District Attorney's Office refused to authorize a search warrant for Vigil's phone because there was no substantiated allegation of any criminal conduct and that “This is outrageously fabricated against the person leading the effort to make sure that [interim police Chief Roger Jimenez] doesn’t become full-time chief of police. Councilman Vigil has, for over a year, voted against interim Chief Jimenez keeping that job because of his lack of qualifications and integrity.” Jimenez was sworn into the permanent chief position on May 28, 2020, after the Española City Council deadlocked in a 4–4 split over Jimenez's confirmation and Mayor Sanchez broke the tie in Jimenez' favor.

Education

Primary and secondary schools
Rio Arriba County has six public school districts.
 Chama Valley Independent Schools
 Dulce Independent Schools
 Española Public Schools
 Jemez Mountain Public Schools
 Mesa Vista Consolidated Schools
 Peñasco Independent Schools

Española Public Schools is the largest school district.

Additionally, there is a Bureau of Indian Education (BIE)-affiliated tribal elementary school, Kha'p'o Community School, in Santa Clara Pueblo (the school's postal address states "Espanola").

Colleges
 Northern New Mexico College with campuses in Española and El Rito
 New Mexico Highlands University campus in Española

Points of interest
 Abiquiu Lake
 Chama River (Rio Grande)
 Cumbres & Toltec Scenic Railroad
 Echo Amphitheater
 Jicarilla Apache Reservation
 Puye Cliff Dwellings
 Ghost Ranch
 Monastery of Christ in the Desert & Abbey Brewing Company
 Project Gasbuggy
 Tierra Amarilla (county seat) & Brazos Cliffs

Communities

City
 Española

Village
 Chama

Census-designated places

 Abiquiú 
 Alcalde
 Brazos
 Canjilon
 Cañones
 Canova
 Chamita
 Chili
 Chimayo (part)
 Cordova
 Coyote
 Dixon 
 Dulce
 El Duende
 El Rito 
 Ensenada
 Gallina
 Hernandez 
 La Madera
 La Mesilla
 La Villita
 Lindrith
 Los Luceros
 Los Ojos
 Lumberton
 Lybrook
 Lyden
 Medanales
 Ohkay Owingeh 
 Ojo Caliente (part)
 Ojo Sarco 
 Pueblito
 Rio Chiquito (part)
 San Jose
 San Juan (former)
 Santa Clara Pueblo
 Tierra Amarilla (county seat)
 Truchas 
 Velarde
 Youngsville

Other communities

 Arroyo del Agua
 Cañoncito
 Cebolla
 Embudo
 Las Tablas
 Lindrith
 Medanales
 Navajo City
 Ojo Sarco
 Petaca
 Rutheron
 San Lorenzo
 Vallecitos

Ghost towns
 Hopewell
 Riverside
 Santa Rosa de Lima
 Sublette

See also
 National Register of Historic Places listings in Rio Arriba County, New Mexico

References

Further reading
 Dethier, D.P. (2004). Geologic map of the Puye quadrangle, Los Alamos, Rio Arriba, Sandoval, and Santa Fe Counties, New Mexico [Miscellaneous Field Studies Map MF-2419)]. Reston, Va.: U.S. Department of the Interior, U.S. Geological Survey.
 Maldonado, F. (2008). Geologic map of the Abiquiu quadrangle, Rio Arriba County, New Mexico [Scientific Investigations Map 2998]. Reston, Va.: U.S. Department of the Interior, U.S. Geological Survey.

External links

 Rio Arriba County website
 Abiquiu Online - Serving the Northern New Mexico Area

 
1852 establishments in New Mexico Territory
Populated places established in 1852
Hispanic and Latino American culture in New Mexico